Elihu Enos, Jr., (January 24, 1824November 13, 1892) was an American educator and politician.

Biography

Born in Kingsboro, New York, Enos graduated from the New York State Normal School at Albany, New York in 1847. Then, in 1847, he moved to Waukesha, Wisconsin Territory and founded the Waukesha Classical and Normal School. He was appointed postmaster of Waukesha in 1849. In 1853, he moved to a farm in the town of Pewaukee, Wisconsin. He served as town superintendent of schools and then Waukesha County, Wisconsin county superintendent of schools. He served in the Wisconsin State Assembly in 1857 and was a member of the Republican Party. During the American Civil War, Enos served in the 28th Wisconsin Volunteer Infantry Regiment; he had to resign from the Union Army and return to Wisconsin because of ill health. In 1872, Enos moved back to Waukesha, Wisconsin and was appointed postmaster of Waukesha for a second time. He died in Waukesha, Wisconsin.

Notes

1824 births
1892 deaths
People from Fulton County, New York
Politicians from Waukesha, Wisconsin
People of Wisconsin in the American Civil War
University at Albany, SUNY alumni
Educators from Wisconsin
19th-century American politicians
People from Pewaukee, Wisconsin
Educators from New York (state)
19th-century American educators
Republican Party members of the Wisconsin State Assembly